Uthman, also spelled Othman, is a male Arabic given name with the general meaning of "wise, most powerful, intuitive, dragon cub". It is popular as a male given name among Muslims. It is also transliterated as Osman or Usman, particularly when the name occurs in languages which either have no /θ/ sound or where the character ⟨ﺙ⟩ is pronounced differently, such as Persian, Bosnian, Turkish, and Urdu, as well as some Arabic dialects.

From there, it also developed into a surname.

Given name
Uthman ibn Affan, third Rashidun caliph and son-in-law of the prophet Muhammad
Uthman Abu Qahafa, father of Abu Bakr
Uthman al-Asghar, one of the sons of Ali ibn Abi Talib
Uthman al-Akbar, one of the sons of Ali ibn Abi Talib
Uthman ibn Naissa, a Berber Wāli of Narbonne and effective Muslim governor of Septimania
Uthman I, a Marinid ruler
Uthman, a Hafsid ruler
Uthman ibn Ali (Bey of Tunis), the sixth leader of the Husainid Dynasty and the ruler of Tunisia briefly in 1814
Othman Al Omeir, a Saudi-born British businessman, journalist and editor
Othman Saat, a former Chief Minister of the state of Johor in Malaysia
Othmane Senadjki, a former journalist and editor-in-chief in Algeria
Othman Wok (1924–2017), Singaporean politician

Middle name
Al-Aziz Uthman, the second son of Saladin and the second Ayyubid Sultan of Egypt
Azalina Othman Said, a tourism minister of Malaysia

Surname and patronymic
Abdul Ghani Othman, the current Menteri Besar of the state of Johor in Malaysia
Abdul Kahar bin Othman, a Singaporean criminal executed for drug trafficking in Singapore
Abdullatif bin Ahmed Al Othman, the governor of Saudi Arabian General Investment Authority (SAGIA)
Arwa Othman, Yemeni writer, journalist, human rights activist and former Minister of Culture
Tuanku Sultan Otteman II, a former Sultan of Deli
Barbara Uthmann, businesswoman and supporter of bobbin lace
Uthman ibn Hunaif, Companions of the Prophet

Fiction
Othman, a fictional historical character in the Christopher Paolini book Inheritance.

See also
Ottoman Empire
Uthman Qur'an
Usman Institute of Technology
Usmanu Danfodio University
Osmanya script
Osmania University
Saidina Uthman Bin Affan Mosque

References

Arabic masculine given names
Arabic-language surnames
German-language surnames

bs:Osman
ca:Othman
ru:Осман